Imbricaria tahitiensis is a species of sea snail, a marine gastropod mollusk, in the family Mitridae, the miters or miter snails.

Description
The length of the shell varies between 17 mm and 20 mm.

Distribution
This marine species occurs off Tahiti.

References

tahitiensis
Gastropods described in 2012